Captain William Bartley (May 16, 1916 – January 28, 2011) was an American military pilot who served with the Tuskegee Airmen during World War II. He graduated from the Tuskegee Institute in 1943, was given the rank of 2nd Lieutenant, and was placed with the 332nd Fighter Group and the 99th Fighter Squadron.

Military service

Bartley Graduated as a pilot from Tuskegee in 1943. He was given the rank of 2nd Lieutenant and placed with the 332nd Fighter Group and the 99th Fighter Squadron.

After his service in World War II he joined the Air Force Reserve as a captain in 1946.

After the war
He later worked in real estate. In the 1960s he became the business manager of Edward Waters College. In the 1970s he opened his own real estate office (Bartley Real Estate.

Awards
Congressional Gold Medal awarded to the Tuskegee Airmen in 2006

Education
Old Stanton High School, Class of 1935
School of Business Administration at Tuskegee Institute in 1939
Tuskegee University Class of 1943

See also
 Executive Order 9981
 List of Tuskegee Airmen
 Military history of African Americans

References

Notes

External links
Tuskegee Airmen at Tuskegee University
 Tuskegee Airmen Archives at the University of California, Riverside Libraries.
 Tuskegee Airmen, Inc.
 Tuskegee Airmen National Historic Site (U.S. National Park Service) 
 Tuskegee Airmen National Museum
 Fly (2009 play about the 332d Fighter Group)
 Executive Order 9981
 List of African American Medal of Honor recipients
 Military history of African Americans

1916 births
2011 deaths
United States Army Air Forces officers
People from Jacksonville, Florida
Tuskegee Airmen
Tuskegee University alumni
Military personnel from Tuskegee, Alabama
People from Florida
Congressional Gold Medal recipients
United States Air Force officers
United States Army Air Forces pilots of World War II
21st-century African-American people